Joel Sartore is an American photographer focusing on conservation photography, speaker, author, teacher, and a long-time contributor to National Geographic magazine. He is the head of The Photo Ark, a 25-year project to document the approximately 12,000 species living in the world's zoos and wildlife sanctuaries.

Life and work

Sartore graduated from the University of Nebraska-Lincoln with a degree in journalism. His interest in nature started in childhood when he learned about the very last passenger pigeon from one of his mother's Time-Life picture books. He has since been in close contact with a wide variety of species including wolves, grizzlies, musk oxen, lions, elephants and polar bears. His first National Geographic assignments introduced him to nature photography, and also allowed him to see human impact on the environment first-hand.

In addition to the work he has done for National Geographic, Sartore has contributed to Audubon Magazine, GEO, Time, Life, Newsweek, Sports Illustrated and numerous book projects. Sartore and his work have been the subjects of several national broadcasts including National Geographic's Explorer, the NBC Nightly News, NPR's Weekend Edition, an hour-long PBS documentary, At Close Range, he has been a contributor on the CBS Sunday Morning Show with Charles Osgood.   In 2015, he had an appearance in the film Racing Extinction where he photographed the very last Rabb's fringe-limbed treefrog.
 Most recently, Sartore and The Photo Ark were the subjects of a three-part series which premiered on PBS titled: RARE: "Creatures of the Photo Ark".

In 2018, Sartore was presented with the Rolex National Geographic Explorer of the Year award.

In 2021 Sartore was inducted into the International Photography Hall of Fame and Museum and he received the Ansel Adams Award for Conservation Photography from the Sierra Club.

In 2022, the U.S. Postal Service announced a pane of 20 stamps presenting a photographic portfolio of 20 representative endangered animal species from Sartore's Photo Ark project.

Sartore is a fellow of the International League of Conservation Photographers (ILCP), and resides in Lincoln, Nebraska with his wife and children.

The Photo Ark

The Photo Ark is a National Geographic project led by Sartore. It has the goal of photographing all species living in zoos and wildlife sanctuaries around the globe. The results have been documented in a series of books and in a 2017 PBS TV miniseries which was released to home video.

To spread awareness of this undertaking, a selection of photographs from The Photo Ark has been exhibited in various locations around the world in a variety of diverse locations such as  the Auditorium Parco della Musica in Rome, Italy, and the Ned Smith Center for Nature and Art Amphitheater in Millersburg, Pennsylvania. Images from the project were also projected on global landmark buildings such as St. Peter's Basilica in the Vatican  and the Empire State Building in New York.

Regarding the scope of the project, Sartore has said "The logistics of pulling off a project of this scope is numbing at times. The travel, the long hours, the setup and teardown of our mobile photo studio… it wears me down just thinking about it." In November 2021, the 12,000th species was photographed for the Photo Ark.

Publications
The Company We Keep: America's Endangered Species, 1995, National Geographic Society (1997 reprint), with Douglas H. Chadwick
Nebraska: Under a Big Red Sky, 1999, Nebraska Book Company (2006 Reprint, University of Nebraska Press), 
Photographing Your Family, 2008, National Geographic, with John Healey
Rare: Portraits of America's Endangered Species, 2010, Focal Point (National Geographic), 
Let's Be Reasonable, 2011, University of Nebraska Press, 
Fundamentals of Photography, 2012, Teaching Co.
Fundamentals of Photography II, 2015, Teaching Co.
The Photo Ark: One Man's Quest to Document the World's Animals, 2017, 
RARE: Creatures of the Photo Ark, PBS mini-series 2017
 Birds Of The Photo Ark, 2018, 
 The Photo Ark Vanishing: The World's Most Vulnerable Animals (2019) 
 Photo Ark Wonders: Celebrating Diversity in the Animal Kingdom (2021)

References

External links

 Joel Sartore Photography
 Joel Sartore - National Geographic Photographer
 Joel Sartore - National Geographic Fellow
 At Close Range with National Geographic: Who is Joel Sartore?-PBS
 

American photographers
National Geographic photographers
Living people
1962 births